Carles Poch Gradin (born 9 November 1982) is a Spanish professional tennis player.  He has won two ATP Challenger events, both in doubles.  

Poch Gradin has reached the finals of ten Futures tournaments; five of these he won—in  Romania, Latvia, Poland, and Spain.

References

External links
 
 

Living people
Spanish male tennis players
Tennis players from Barcelona
1982 births